Zeballos Lake is a lake on northern Vancouver Island in British Columbia, Canada.  Its outlet is into the Nomash River.

See also
Zeballos (disambiguation)#Places

References

Lakes of Vancouver Island
Northern Vancouver Island
Rupert Land District